Gildemeister is a German surname. Notable people with the surname include:

Alfred Gildemeister (1875–1928), German politician
Eberhard Gildemeister (1897–1978), German architect
Fritz Gildemeister (born 1949), Chilean-American tennis player, brother of Hans and Heinz
Hans Gildemeister (born 1956), Chilean tennis player, brother of Fritz and Heinz
Heinz Gildemeister (born 1960), Chilean-Peruvian tennis player, brother of Fritz and Hans
Johann Gildemeister (1812–1890), German Orientalist
Karl Gildemeister (1820–1869), German architect
Laura Gildemeister (born 1964), Peruvian tennis player, ex-wife of Heinz
Otto Gildemeister (1823–1902), German journalist and translator
Rita Gildemeister (born 1947), German athlete

See also
 Gildemeister AG

German-language surnames